Aana Valarthiya Vanampadi is a 1959 Indian Malayalam-language film, directed and produced by P. Subramaniam. The film stars Thikkurissi, S.P.Pillai, Bahadoor, M.N.Nambiar, Miss Kumari etc. The film had musical score by Br. Lakshmanan.

The film was released in Tamil on 27 November 1959, titled Yaanai Valartha Vaanambadi. Somasundaram wrote the dialogues. A sequel titled Aana Valarthiya Vanampadiyude Makan was released in 1971.

Cast 
 Thikkurissy Sukumaran Nair as Lakshmi's husband
 Bahadoor as Azhakan
 Friend Ramaswamy as Mani
 MN Nambiar as Kandappan
 Miss Kumari as Lakshmi, Malli/Meena (double role)
 SD Subbalakshmi as Thankamani
 SP Pillai as Idea Annan thampi
 K. V. Shanthi as Mohana
 Sreeram as Sekhar

Soundtrack 
Tamil songs
Lyrics were penned by Ku. Ma. Balasubramaniam, Kambadasan, Surabhi and Sundarakannan. Playback singers are Sirkazhi Govindarajan, Thiruchi Loganathan, P. Leela, P. B. Srinivas, K. Jamuna Rani, A. M. Rajah and Jikki.

References

External links 
 

1950s Malayalam-language films
1959 films
Films about elephants
Aana1
Films scored by Br Lakshmanan